The Crazy Companies II (最佳損友闖情關) is a 1988 Hong Kong comedy film directed by Wong Jing starring Andy Lau, Sandra Ng and Natalis Chan.

Summary
The sequel to The Crazy Companies sees Kwai (Andy Lau) and his buddies return. Following straight on from the first movie, it starts with the wedding of Horny (Pak-cheung Chan) to his overbearing fiancée Doriana (Sandra Ng).

At the reception we learn that the Kwai's brother is in financial trouble and the company is going to be bought over by Fok's thanks to the meddling of evil executive Robert Cheng. After the takeover, Kwai, Horny, Frank and Kim must get jobs with Fok's and rise up the corporate ladder again before Robert Cheng returns from his 3-month vacation.

Cast
 Andy Lau - Tsui Ting-kwai
 Natalis Chan - Tam Sad-Chiu
 Stanley Fung - Frank
 Lawrence Ng - Robery Cheng
 Charlie Cho - Sau Hau-Kei
 Shing Fui-On - Wut Yuan
 Carol Cheng - Falishanna
 Rosamund Kwan - Niko
 Chingmy Yau - Kimmy
 Sandra Ng - Dorlina
 Chan Fai-hung	
 Jamie Chik		
 Hui Ying-Sau - Tsui Ying-sau
 Lau Siu-Ming - Fok Ka-tung
 Albert Lo - Manager Law
 Law Lan - Kimmy's mum
 Michael Miu
 Pak Yan - Niko's mum
 Joan Tong Lai-Kau - Happy
 Wong Sen
 Yip Wing-Cho - Wut Tak-king
 Yung Sai-Kit - Tsui Ting-Fu

See also
Andy Lau filmography
Wong Jing filmography

References

External links

1988 films
1988 comedy films
Hong Kong comedy films
1980s Cantonese-language films
Films directed by Wong Jing
1980s Hong Kong films